This is a list of oldest and youngest National Basketball Association players. The National Basketball Association (NBA) is a men's professional basketball league in North America. The NBA was founded in 1946 as the Basketball Association of America (BAA). The league adopted its current name at the start of the  when it merged with the National Basketball League (NBL). The oldest person ever to play in the NBA was Nat Hickey, a coach who activated himself as a player for a game two days before his 46th birthday. The youngest player ever to play in the NBA was Andrew Bynum, who played his first game only six days after his 18th birthday. The oldest active player is Miami Heat power forward Udonis Haslem, who is currently 42 years old. The youngest active player in the NBA is Detroit Pistons center Jalen Duren, the 13th overall pick in the 2022 NBA draft, who is currently 19 years old and was born on November 18, 2003.

Key

Oldest players

The oldest player ever to play in the NBA was Nat Hickey who played one game in the 1947–48 season when he was 45 years and 363 days old. Hickey, who was coaching the Providence Steamrollers at the time, decided to activate himself and played in a game for the Steamrollers. In his first game as a player for the Steamrollers, he missed all six of his shot attempts and only scored two points from three free throw attempts; he only played in one more game before retiring as a player two days shy of his 46th birthday. The second-oldest player is Kevin Willis, who played 20 seasons (excluding the 1988–89 season he missed due to injury) in the league before he sat out the 2005–06 season and earned a contract with the Dallas Mavericks on April 2, 2007. Willis then played five games for the Mavericks at the age of 44. The third-oldest player is Hall of Famer Robert Parish. Parish, who played with the Boston Celtics in the 1980s, played his last season with the Chicago Bulls at the age of 43. He played in 1,611 regular season games during his 21-year career, more than any other player in NBA history. When the Bulls won the 1997 Finals, Parish became the oldest player ever to win the NBA championship. There are 31 players who played in the NBA after they turned 40. The oldest active player is Udonis Haslem, who is now 42 years old. Haslem played his first game in the 2003–04 NBA season and has played for 19 seasons. He is the only player born before 1984 who is still active and under contract with an NBA team.

All-time

Active

Youngest players

NBA players usually come from U.S. college basketball. In the past, a college player had to complete his four-year college eligibility before he could enter the league through the NBA draft or as a free agent. In the 1970s, the league began to allow college underclassmen and high school players to enter the league. However, the trend of drafting high school players only began in the mid 1990s. This has led to more younger players entering the league directly after high school graduation. In 2005, the league and the players' union agreed on a new collective bargaining agreement that includes a minimum age limit which requires that players who wish to enter the league must be at least 19 years old on December 31 of the year of the draft, and at least one year removed from high school. International players who did not play college basketball also have to be at least 19 years old on the same date to be able to play in the NBA. Despite a trend toward drafting younger players, the NBA has a higher average age than it had in the 1980s. However, since the NBA introduced the minimum age limit in 2005, the league's average age has decreased in the past few seasons. The youngest player to ever play in the NBA was Andrew Bynum who played his first game at the age of 18 years and 6 days old. Bynum, who was also the youngest player ever selected in the NBA Draft, went into the NBA straight out of high school. Jermaine O'Neal and Kobe Bryant, both drafted in 1996, were the second- and third-youngest players. Serbian Darko Miličić was the youngest player ever to play in an NBA Finals game. He played for the Detroit Pistons in Game 3 of the 2004 Finals at the age of 18 years and 356 days old. The Pistons won the 2004 Finals and Miličić became the youngest player ever to win the NBA championship, being only five days away from his 19th birthday at the time. There are currently 29 players who played in the NBA before they turned 19. Nineteen of them came to the league straight out of high school, while 7 of them are international players who never played basketball in the U.S. high schools or colleges before they entered the NBA, and three players, Devin Booker, Joshua Primo and Jalen Duren played one year of college before entering the NBA all while remaining 18 years old throughout the process.

All-time

Active

See also

List of National Basketball Association career games played leaders
List of National Basketball Association seasons played leaders
List of oldest professional athletes by sport
List of oldest Major League Baseball players
List of oldest National Hockey League players

References
General

Specific

Oldest
National Basketball Association players
National Basketball Association players